Paulo Markolaj (born 31 October 1993 in Bushat, Shkodër County) is an Albanian football player.

References

1993 births
Living people
People from Vau i Dejës
Albanian footballers
Association football midfielders
KF Vllaznia Shkodër players
KS Ada Velipojë players
KS Veleçiku Koplik players
Kategoria Superiore players
Kategoria e Parë players